January 8 – Eastern Orthodox liturgical calendar – January 10

All fixed commemorations below are observed on January 22 by Eastern Orthodox Churches on the Old Calendar.

For January 9th, Orthodox Churches on the Old Calendar commemorate the Saints listed on December 27.

Feasts
 Afterfeast of the Theophany of Our Lord and Savior Jesus Christ.

Saints
 Prophet Shemaiah (Samaia, Semeias), (III Kings 12:22), (10th century BC) (see also: January 8 - Greek)
 Martyr Polyeuctus of Melitene in Armenia (259)
 Martyr Antonina of Nicomedia, martyred at sea.
 Martyr Lawrence, martyred in the arena, by the pagans.
 Saint Peter of Sebaste, Bishop of Sebaste in Armenia (c. 395)
 Saint Eustratius the Wonderworker, of Tarsus (821)
 Venerable Basil and Gregory the Wonderworkers, uncles of Saint Eustratius (9th century)

Pre-Schism Western saints
 Virgin-Martyr Paschasia, venerated from ancient times in Dijon in France (c. 178)
 Epictetus, Jucundus, Secundus, Vitalis, Felix and seven other Companions - Twelve martyrs in North Africa, probably under Decian (c. 250)
 Virgin-martyr Marciana of Mauretania, in Mauritania in North Africa (c. 303)
 Saint Marcellinus of Ancona, Bishop of Ancona (566)
 Saint Waningus (Vaneng), Benedictine abbot (c. 686)
 Saint Maurontus (Maurontius, Mauruntius),  founder of the monastery of Saint-Florent-le-Vieil on the Loire in France (c. 700)
 Saint Adrian, Abbot of Sts Peter and Paul, later called St Augustine's, in Canterbury (710)
 Saint Brithwald (Brihtwald), a monk and then the Abbot of Reculver in Kent, and in 693 becoming the ninth Archbishop of Canterbury (731)
 Saint Foellan (Foilan, Fillan), born in Ireland, he accompanied his mother, St Kentigerna, and his relative, St Comgan, to Scotland, where he lived as a monk (8th century)

Post-Schism Orthodox saints
 New Martyr Parthena of Edessa, in Macedonia (1375)
 Hieromartyr Philip, Metropolitan of Moscow and Wonderworker of all Russia (1569)
 Saint Jonah (Miroshnichenko), (Peter in Schema), founder of Holy Trinity Monastery in Kiev, Wonderworker (1902)

New martyrs and confessors
 New Hieromartyr Paul (Nikolsky), Priest (1943)

Other commemorations
 Commemoration of the great earthquake at Constantinople (869)
 Translation of the relics (903) of St. Judoc, hermit of Ponthieu.

Icon gallery

Notes

References

Sources
 January 9/January 22. Orthodox Calendar (PRAVOSLAVIE.RU).
 January 22 / January 9. HOLY TRINITY RUSSIAN ORTHODOX CHURCH (A parish of the Patriarchate of Moscow).
 January 9. OCA - The Lives of the Saints.
 The Autonomous Orthodox Metropolia of Western Europe and the Americas (ROCOR). St. Hilarion Calendar of Saints for the year of our Lord 2004. St. Hilarion Press (Austin, TX). p. 6.
 January 9. Latin Saints of the Orthodox Patriarchate of Rome.
 The Roman Martyrology. Transl. by the Archbishop of Baltimore. Last Edition, According to the Copy Printed at Rome in 1914. Revised Edition, with the Imprimatur of His Eminence Cardinal Gibbons. Baltimore: John Murphy Company, 1916. p. 10.
Greek Sources
 Great Synaxaristes:  9 ΙΑΝΟΥΑΡΙΟΥ. ΜΕΓΑΣ ΣΥΝΑΞΑΡΙΣΤΗΣ.
  Συναξαριστής. 9 Ιανουαρίου. ECCLESIA.GR. (H ΕΚΚΛΗΣΙΑ ΤΗΣ ΕΛΛΑΔΟΣ). 
Russian Sources
  22 января (9 января). Православная Энциклопедия под редакцией Патриарха Московского и всея Руси Кирилла (электронная версия). (Orthodox Encyclopedia - Pravenc.ru).
  9 января (ст.ст.) 22 января 2013 (нов. ст.). Русская Православная Церковь Отдел внешних церковных связей. (DECR).

January in the Eastern Orthodox calendar